László Pál (5 September 1942 – 21 November 2017) was a Hungarian politician and electrical engineer, who served as Minister of Industry and Trade in the cabinet of Prime Minister Gyula Horn from 1994 to 1995. He was also a Member of Parliament for the Hungarian Socialist Party (MSZP) from 1990 until his resignation in 1997. He was appointed CEO of the Hungarian Electrical Works Ltd. (MVM) in 2002.

Pál died on 21 November 2017 after a long illness, aged 75.

References

1942 births
2017 deaths
Hungarian electrical engineers
Government ministers of Hungary
Members of the Hungarian Socialist Workers' Party
Hungarian Socialist Party politicians
Members of the National Assembly of Hungary (1990–1994)
Members of the National Assembly of Hungary (1994–1998)
Politicians from Budapest